The Americas Zone was one of three zones of regional competition in the 2011 Fed Cup.

Group I
Venue: National Tennis Centre, Buenos Aires, Argentina (clay, outdoors)
Date: Week of 31 January (ties played 2–4 February)

The eight teams were divided into two pools of four teams. The winners of both pools played off to decide which nation progresses to World Group II play-offs. Nations finished third and fourth in each pool play-off to determine which nation was relegated to Americas Zone Group II for 2012

Pools

Play-offs

 advanced to World Group II play-offs.

Group II
Venue: Venue: Centro Nacional de Tenis, Santo Domingo, Dominican Republic (hard, outdoors)
Date: Week of 16 May (ties played 16–22 May)

The ten teams were divided into two pools of five teams. The top two teams of both pools played off to decide which nation was promoted to the Americas Zone Group I for 2012.

Play-offs

 and  promoted to Americas Group I in 2012.

See also
Fed Cup structure

References

 Fed Cup 2011, Americas, Group I
 Fed Cup 2011, Americas, Group II

External links
 Fed Cup website

 
Americas
Tennis tournaments in Argentina
Sport in Santo Domingo
Tennis tournaments in the Dominican Republic